Hashim Kareem Ricardo Arcia (born 8 October 1988) is a Trinidadian international footballer who plays for Defence Force as a midfielder.

Career
Born in Laventille, he has played club football for Ma Pau Stars, St. Ann's Rangers, W Connection and Defence Force.

He made his international debut for Trinidad and Tobago in 2012.

References

1988 births
Living people
Trinidad and Tobago footballers
Trinidad and Tobago international footballers
Ma Pau Stars S.C. players
St. Ann's Rangers F.C. players
W Connection F.C. players
Defence Force F.C. players
Association football midfielders
2021 CONCACAF Gold Cup players